Malaysia has participated from the 1981 World Games.

Medal count

Medals by sport

Medalists

See also
Malaysia at the Olympics
Malaysia at the Paralympics
Malaysia at the Asian Games
Malaysia at the Commonwealth Games
Malaysia at the Universiade

References

External links
 All the medals of the World Games at Sports 123

 
Nations at the World Games